William Cullen (1710–1790) was a Scottish physician and chemist.

William Cullen may also refer to:

Law
 William James Cullen, Lord Cullen (1859–1941), Scottish judge, Senator of the College of Justice from 1909
 William Cullen, Baron Cullen of Whitekirk (born 1935), senior member of the Scottish Judiciary
 William Portus Cullen (1855–1935), chief-justice in New South Wales, Australia

Sports
 William Cullen (cricketer) (1887–1945), Australian cricketer
 William John Cullen (1894–1960), Irish rugby international
 William Goodsir-Cullen (1907–1994), Indian field hockey player

Other
 Bill Cullen (1920–1990), American television and radio personality
 Bill Cullen (businessman) (born 1942), Irish businessman, philanthropist, and media personality
 William Cullen (representative) (1826–1914), U.S. representative from Illinois
 William Cullen (Resident) (1785–1862), British Army Officer

See also
Will Cullen Hart (born 1971), musician
William Cullen Bryant (1794–1878), American writer
 Lord Cullen (disambiguation)